Club Island may refer to:
Club Island (Georgian Bay) in Georgian Bay
Club Island (Saint Lawrence River) in the Saint Lawrence River